Durkan may refer to:

Geography
Durkan-e Bala - Upper Durkan, a village in Kerman Province, Iran
Durkan-e Pain - Lower Durkan, a village in Kerman Province, Iran

People
Bernard Durkan (b. 1945), Irish politician
Frank Durkan (1930-2006), American lawyer
Jenny Durkan, Mayor of Seattle
Kieron Durkan (b. 1973), footballer
Mark Durkan (b. 1960), Northern Irish politician
Mark H. Durkan, Northern Irish politician

See also
Durkan's test